Beeston is a town in the Borough of Broxtowe, Nottinghamshire, England.  The town contains 25 listed buildings that are recorded in the National Heritage List for England.   Of these, two are listed at Grade I, the highest of the three grades, and the others are at Grade II, the lowest grade.  In the town is Boots Factory Site, which contains three listed buildings, two of which are listed at Grade I.  Most of the other listed buildings are houses and associated structures, and the rest include a church, a village cross, two bridges, a public house, a railway station, former mills and three war memorials.


Key

Buildings

References

Citations

Sources

 

Lists of listed buildings in Nottinghamshire
L